The Copa Aerosur & del Sur 2010 was the eighth edition of the summer soccer tournament sponsored by Aerosur. It involved six teams from the core cities in Bolivia: Bolivar and The Strongest of La Paz, Cochabamba Aurora and Wilstermann, Blooming and Oriente Petrolero of Santa Cruz, and six teams from 2009 Copa Simón Bolívar.

The Copa Aerosur & del Sur 2010 had novelties involving six teams from Regional League who participated in Copa Simon Bolivar. If one of these teams won the Copa Aerosur they would receive $150,000 from Aerosur Company. For the LPFB teams the winner received a full free ticket for the whole year and $90,000 and the runner-up 75% discount; this also applied for Copa del Sur teams.

In the previous season, Bolivar won its first title after against Jorge Wilstermann. In this season, Bolivar wanted to defend the title and to be one of the teams with the most championships along with Blooming and Oriente Petrolero.

Copa Aerosur
The Champions of Copa Aerosur would play an international match against Club Atlético River Plate (Uruguay) unless the champion was playing Copa Libertadores when the match would be for the runner-up.

Play-off round

|}

First leg

Second leg

Semi-final
 The Strongest qualified as the best loser.

|}

Second leg

Final

|}

Copa Aerosur Internacional
 Because Bolivar qualified for Copa Libertadores then the International game was for the runner-up.

|}

Copa Aerosur del Sur

Estadio Olímpico Patria would host this edition and for the first time the champion of Copa Aerosur del Sur would play an international against Rio Branco Club from Brazil.

Quarter-final

|}

Semi-final
 Real Potosi qualified as the best loser.

|}

Final

|}

References 

2010 domestic association football cups
2010
2010 in Bolivian football